Josef Řihák (born 25 April 1959 in Karlovy Vary) is a Czech politician. Řihák is a member of Senate of the Parliament of the Czech Republic and the Assembly of the Central Bohemian Region. He is also a former member of Chamber of Deputies of the Czech Republic and a former mayor of Příbram.

Řihák is a graduate at Brno agricultural college, he worked vet, specializing in food hygiene and agricultural ecology.

He was elected into the Assembly of the Central Bohemian Region in 2000 for the Czech Social Democratic Party, two years later he was also elected into the Příbram assembly and became the city council member under mayor Ivan Fuksa.

In 2002, he was also elected into the Chamber of Deputies of the Czech Republic and was re-elected in 2006. He is a member of the agricultural committee of the Chamber of Deputies.

In 2006 he led the Příbram social democrats in the municipal elections. The party gained two more seats in comparison to the 2002 elections. After two-weeks negotiations, Řihák was elected new city mayor by a coalition Social Democrats and SNK European Democrats, supported by Communist Party of Bohemia and Moravia deputies.

He then promised to leave his Central-Bohemian region's assembly seat.

Řihák is married and has a son and a daughter.

Footnotes

External links
 Řihák's page on the Chamber of Deputies of the Czech Republic (in Czech)

Příbram
Living people
1959 births
People from Karlovy Vary
Czech Social Democratic Party politicians
Czech Social Democratic Party Senators
Czech Social Democratic Party MPs
Czech Social Democratic Party governors
Members of the Chamber of Deputies of the Czech Republic (2002–2006)
Members of the Chamber of Deputies of the Czech Republic (2006–2010)
Mayors of places in the Czech Republic
Czech Social Democratic Party mayors